Elaeocarpus dinagatensis is a species of flowering plant in the Elaeocarpaceae family. It is found in the Philippines

References

dinagatensis
Endemic flora of the Philippines
Vulnerable plants
Taxonomy articles created by Polbot